The Art of Cricket is an instructional book on the game of cricket written by Sir Don Bradman in 1958. It is illustrated with black-and-white photographs and diagrams.

Other books of the same title
 Warwick Armstrong wrote a cricket primer of the same title, first published by Methuen, London in 1922.

References

Cricket books
Don Bradman
1958 non-fiction books
Hodder & Stoughton books